The 1992–93 Australian Baseball League Championship was won by the Melbourne Monarchs who were back after being expelled from the league in 1990. The Monarchs defeated Perth Heat in 2 games to take out the Championship.

Ladder

Championship series

Semi Final 1: Game 1: 1st Vs 4th at Parry Field

Semi Final 1: Game 2: 1st Vs 4th at Parry Field

Semi Final 2: Game 1: 2nd Vs 3rd at Melbourne Ballpark

Semi Final 2: Game 2: 2nd Vs 3rd at Melbourne Ballpark

Semi Final 2: Game 3: 2nd Vs 3rd at Melbourne Ballpark

Final Series: Game 1: Winner Semi Final 1 Vs Winner Semi Final 2 at Parry Field

Final Series: Game 2: Winner Semi Final 1 Vs Winner Semi Final 2 at Parry Field
20 February 1993

Awards

Top Stats

All-Star Team

References

Australian Baseball League (1989–1999) seasons
1992 in Australian baseball
1993 in Australian baseball